Grimpoteuthis abyssicola is a species of small deep-sea octopus known from two specimens. The holotype specimen was a female collected on the Lord Howe Rise (central Tasman Sea off New Zealand), between 3154 and 3180 meters depth. A second specimen (a male) was collected on the continental slope of south-eastern Australia between 2821 and 2687 m depth.
While the organism has not been formally assigned a vernacular name, it has been proposed to be referred to commonly as the Angle-shelled dumbo octopus.

The female type specimen had a mantle about 75 millimeters long, while its total body reached 305 millimeters long (the male specimen had a longer mantle length at 99 mm, but a shorter total length of 245 mm). G. abyssicola's internal shell is U-shaped, lacking any lateral prominences/shoulders, and with the ends of shell rounded, this shell shape is distinctive from other Grimpoteuthis (with the possible exception of Grimpoteuthis hippocrepium). This species can also be distinguished from other members of Grimpoteuthis due to the absence of both a radula and posterior salivary glands, how many suckers it has (up to 74 or 77 per arm on the known specimens), and where the arm cirri commence. On the holotype the first 6-8 suckers on each arm are small, then larger up to sucker 30-35, followed this are a further 30-35 suckers rapidly decreasing in size to the arm tip.

Present records of this species are too few to assess its conservation status (but it is likely not threatened given its abyssal distribution).

References

Octopuses
Molluscs of the Pacific Ocean
Molluscs described in 1999
Species known from a single specimen
Cephalopods of Oceania
Cephalopods of Australia
Molluscs of New Zealand